The 2019–20 season was the second consecutive season of Benevento in the second division of Italian football after relegation from Serie A in 2018.

Along with competing in the league, the club also participated in the Coppa Italia.

On 29 June 2020, Benevento secured promotion to the Serie A with seven matches to spare. At the time, Benevento had won 23 of their 31 league games and lost just once, and had a 24-point advantage over nearest rivals Crotone and Cittadella. Ascoli were the last club to be promoted with seven games remaining, and they did so in 1977–78 when only two points were awarded for a victory.

Players

Squad information

Out on loan

Competitions

Serie B

League table

Results summary

Positions by round
The table lists the positions of Benevento after each week of matches. In order to preserve chronological evolvements, any postponed matches are not included to the round at which they were originally scheduled, but added to the full round they were played immediately afterwards.

Matches

August

Coppa Italia

Second round

Statistics

Hat-tricks

Note
(H) – Home  (A) – Away

Clean sheets

References

Benevento Calcio seasons
Benevento